Nebo is a small village in Gwynedd, Wales. It is adjacent to the small village of Nasareth and near the larger villages of Llanllyfni and Penygroes.

Amenities 
Nebo has a Welsh-medium primary school, Ysgol Gynradd Nebo. As of 2020, there were 18 children on roll at the school. In 2017, approximately 58% of pupils come from Welsh-speaking homes.

It is mainly a small residential area now, as the chapel and post office have been sold in the last couple of decades. There is a play-area and a football pitch where school and community events are held.

Broadcasting mast 
The Arfon television broadcasting mast is on a nearby mountain and supplies most of the valley below, as well as a large part of Gwynedd. Erected in 1962, it is currently the highest structure in Wales since the addition of a new antenna in 2008 slightly extended it to 317 metres.

References

External links 

www.geograph.co.uk : photos of Nebo, Gwynedd and surrounding area

Villages in Gwynedd
Villages in Wales